Task-based language teaching (TBLT), also known as task-based instruction (TBI), focuses on the use of authentic language to complete meaningful tasks in the target language. Such tasks can include visiting a doctor, conducting an interview, or calling customer service for help. Assessment is primarily based on task outcome (the appropriate completion of real-world tasks) rather than on accuracy of prescribed language forms. This makes TBLT especially popular for developing target language fluency and student confidence. As such, TBLT can be considered a branch of communicative language teaching (CLT).

Background
Task-based language learning has its origins in communicative language teaching, and is a subcategory of it. Educators adopted task-based language learning for a variety of reasons. Some moved to a task-based syllabus in an attempt to develop learner capacity to express meaning, while others wanted to make language in the classroom truly communicative, rather than the pseudo-communication that results from classroom activities with no direct connection to real-life situations. Others, like Prabhu in the Bangalore Project, thought that tasks were a way of tapping into learners' natural mechanisms for second-language acquisition, and weren't concerned with real-life communication per se.

TBLT was popularized by N. S. Prabhu while working in Bangalore, India, according to Jeremy Harmer. Prabhu noticed that his students could learn language just as easily with a non-linguistic problem as when they were concentrating on linguistic questions. Major scholars who have done research in this area include Teresa P. Pica, Martin East, and Michael Long.

Definition of a task
A concept, earlier known as the "communicative activity" in 1970s and 80's was later replaced by the term task has since been defined differently by different scholars. Willis (1996) has defined a task as a goal based activity involving the use of the learners' existing language resources, that leads to the outcome. Examples include playing games, and solving problems and puzzles etc.  Ellis (2003) defines a task as a work plan that involves a pragmatic processing of language, using the learners' existing language resources and attention to meaning, and resulting in the completion of an outcome which can be assessed for its communicative function. David Nunan (2004) draws upon the definitions given by other experts, of two types of tasks: target tasks and pedagogical tasks. Targets tasks refer to doing something outside the classroom and in the real world; whereas pedagogical tasks refer to the tasks students perform inside the classroom and in response to target language input or processing. Nunan concludes that target tasks may be non-linguistic.  He defines pedagogical task as a classroom activity that involves a student to understand and produce the target language while focusing on conveying the meaning and not being too concerned with form. On the other hand, Long (1985) defines a task as things people do in everyday life.

According to Rod Ellis, a task has four main characteristics:

 A task involves a primary focus on (pragmatic) meaning.
 A task has some kind of ‘gap’. (Prabhu identified the three main types as information gap, reasoning gap, and opinion gap.)
 The participants choose the linguistic resources needed to complete the task.
 A task has a clearly defined, non-linguistic outcome.

In practice
The core of the lesson or project is, as the name suggests, the task. Teachers and curriculum developers should bear in mind that any attention to form, i.e., grammar or vocabulary, increases the likelihood that learners may be distracted from the task itself and become preoccupied with detecting and correcting errors and/or looking up language in dictionaries and grammar references. Although there may be several effective frameworks for creating a task-based learning lesson, here is a basic outline:

Pre-task
In the pre-task, the teacher will present what will be expected from the students in the task phase. Additionally, in the "weak" form of TBLT, the teacher may prime the students with key vocabulary or grammatical constructs, although this can mean that the activity is, in effect, more similar to the more traditional present-practice-produce (PPP) paradigm. In "strong" task-based learning lessons, learners are responsible for selecting the appropriate language for any given context themselves. The instructors may also present a model of the task by either doing it themselves or by presenting picture, audio, or video demonstrating the task.

Task
During the task phase, the students perform the task, typically in small groups, although this depends on the type of activity. Unless the teacher plays a particular role in the task, the teacher's role is typically limited to one of an observer or counselor—thereby making it a more student-centered methodology.

Review
If learners have created tangible linguistic products, e.g. text, montage, presentation, audio or video recording, learners can review each other's work and offer constructive feedback. If a task is set to extend over longer periods of time, e.g. weeks, and includes iterative cycles of constructive activity followed by review, TBLT can be seen as analogous to Project-based learning.

Types of task
According to N. S. Prabhu, there are three main categories of task: information-gap, reasoning-gap, and opinion-gap.

Information-gap activity, which involves a transfer of given information from one person to another – or from one form to another, or from one place to another – generally calling for the decoding or encoding of information from or into language. One example is pair work in which each member of the pair has a part of the total information (for example an incomplete picture) and attempts to convey it verbally to the other. Another example is completing a tabular representation with information available in a given piece of text. The activity often involves selection of relevant information as well, and learners may have to meet criteria of completeness and correctness in making the transfer.

Reasoning-gap activity, which involves deriving some new information from given information through processes of inference, deduction, practical reasoning, or a perception of relationships or patterns. One example is working out a teacher's timetable on the basis of given class timetables. Another is deciding what course of action is best (for example cheapest or quickest) for a given purpose and within given constraints. The activity necessarily involves comprehending and conveying information, as in an information-gap activity, but the information to be conveyed is not identical with that initially comprehended. There is a piece of reasoning which connects the two.

Opinion-gap activity, which involves identifying and articulating a personal preference, feeling, or attitude in response to a given situation. One example is story completion; another is taking part in the discussion of a social issue. The activity may involve using factual information and formulating arguments to justify one's opinion, but there is no objective procedure for demonstrating outcomes as right or wrong, and no reason to expect the same outcome from different individuals or on different occasions.

Reception
According to Jon Larsson, in considering problem-based learning for language learning, i.e., task-based language learning:

...one of the main virtues of PBL is that it displays a significant advantage over traditional methods in how the communicative skills of the students are improved. The general ability of social interaction is also positively affected. These are, most will agree, two central factors in language learning. By building a language course around assignments that require students to act, interact and communicate it is hopefully possible to mimic some of the aspects of learning a language “on site”, i.e. in a country where it is actually spoken. Seeing how learning a language in such an environment is generally much more effective than teaching the language exclusively as a foreign language, this is something that would hopefully be beneficial.

Larsson goes on to say:
Another large advantage of PBL is that it encourages students to gain a deeper sense of understanding. Superficial learning is often a problem in language education, for example when students, instead of acquiring a sense of when and how to use which vocabulary, learn all the words they will need for the exam next week and then promptly forget them.
In a PBL classroom this is combatted by always introducing the vocabulary in a real-world situation, rather than as words on a list, and by activating the student; students are not passive receivers of knowledge, but are instead required to actively acquire the knowledge. The feeling of being an integral part of their group also motivates students to learn in a way that the prospect of a final examination rarely manages to do.

Task-based learning benefits students because it is more student-centered, allows for more meaningful communication, and often provides for practical extra-linguistic skill building. As the tasks are likely to be familiar to the students (e.g.: visiting the doctor), students are more likely to be engaged, which may further motivate them in their language learning.

According to Jeremy Harmer, tasks promote language acquisition through the types of language and interaction they require. Harmer says that although the teacher may present language in the pre-task, the students are ultimately free to use what grammar constructs and vocabulary they want. This allows them, he says, to use all the language they know and are learning, rather than just the 'target language' of the lesson. On the other hand, according to Loschky and Bley-Vroman, tasks can also be designed to make certain target forms 'task-essential,' thus making it communicatively necessary for students to practice using them. In terms of interaction, information gap tasks in particular have been shown to promote negotiation of meaning and output modification.

According to Plews and Zhao, task-based language learning can suffer in practice from poorly informed implementation and adaptations that alter its fundamental nature. They say that lessons are frequently changed to be more like traditional teacher-led presentation-practice-production lessons than task-based lessons.

Professional conferences and organizations
As an outgrowth of the widespread interest in task-based teaching, the Biennial International Conference on Task-Based Language Teaching has occurred every other year since 2005. Past conferences have been held in Belgium, the United States, England, New Zealand, Canada, with the 2017 conference scheduled to take place in Barcelona, Spain. These events promote theoretical and practical research on TBLT. In addition, the Japan Association for Language Teaching has a special interest group devoted to task-based learning, which has also hosted its own conference in Japan.

Related approaches to language teaching
 Problem-based Learning (PBL) is a student-centered pedagogy in which students learn about a subject in the context of complex, multifaceted, and realistic problems.
 Content-based instruction (CBI) incorporates authentic materials and tasks to drive language instruction.
 Content and language integrated learning (CLIL) is an approach for learning content through an additional language (foreign or second), thus teaching both the subject and the language. The idea of its proponents was to create an "umbrella term" which encompasses different forms of using language as medium of instruction.
 Task-supported language teaching (TSLT) also incorporates task as a main part of the lesson. However, while TBLT follows the pre-task, task, and post-task sequence, TSLT uses Present-Practice-Produce model as its spine bone then adds a task as an activity to practice linguistic items in the production stage. In practice, some people still mistake TSLT for TBTL.

See also
 Communicative language teaching
 Content-based instruction
 Content and language integrated learning
 English as a second or foreign language
 Input hypothesis
 Problem-based learning
 Project-based learning
 Second-language acquisition

References

Bibliography

Language-teaching methodology